Fokas may refer to:

People
Athanassios S. Fokas, mathematician
Nikos Fokas, poet, essayist and translator
 Fokas (Greek shoe company)

Places
Nikiforos Fokas, a former municipality in Crete